Cardell Cooper was the Assistant Secretary for Community Planning and Development at the Department of Housing and Urban Development. He was also Mayor of East Orange, New Jersey in 1989 and again in 1993. He was the youngest mayor in the city's history.

References

United States Assistant Secretaries of Housing and Urban Development
Mayors of East Orange, New Jersey
Living people
Year of birth missing (living people)